Mertendorf is a municipality in the Burgenlandkreis district, in Saxony-Anhalt, Germany. On 1 January 2010 it absorbed the former municipalities Görschen and Löbitz (including Utenbach, absorbed on 31 December 2009). The municipality consists of the following Ortsteile (villages):

 Cauerwitz
 Droitzen
 Görschen
 Großgestewitz
 Löbitz
 Mertendorf
 Pauscha
 Punkewitz
 Rathewitz
 Scheiplitz
 Seiselitz
 Utenbach
 Wetterscheidt

References

Burgenlandkreis